Arthonia stereocaulina is a species of lichenicolous fungus in the family Arthoniaceae.

Distribution
Arthonia stereocaulina has been reported from Alaska, Canada, Iceland, Russia and Svalbard.

Host species
As the name suggests, Arthonia stereocaulina infects lichens of the genus Stereocaulon. Known host species are:

 Stereocaulon alpinum
 Stereocaulon arcticum
 Stereocaulon botryosum
 Stereocaulon capitellatum
 Stereocaulon depressum
 Stereocaulon glareosum
 Stereocaulon groenlandicum
 Stereocaulon intermedium
 Stereocaulon myriocarpum
 Stereocaulon paschale
 Stereocaulon rivulorum
 Stereocaulon saxatile
 Stereocaulon tomentosum

References

Arthoniomycetes
Fungi of Canada
Fungi of Iceland
Fungi of Russia
Fungi of Svalbard
Fungi of the United States
Taxa described in 1993
Taxa named by Rolf Santesson
Lichenicolous fungi